Greenville Township is one of five townships in Floyd County, Indiana. As of the 2010 census, its population was 6,746 and it contained 2,532 housing units.

History
The Jersey Park Farm was listed on the National Register of Historic Places in 1984.

Geography

Cities and towns
 Galena
 Greenville

Unincorporated towns
 Navilleton

Adjacent townships
 Wood Township, Clark County (northeast)
 Lafayette Township (east)
 Georgetown Township (southeast)
 Jackson Township, Harrison County (southwest)
 Morgan Township, Harrison County (west)
 Jackson Township, Washington County (northwest)

Major highways
 U.S. Route 150
 Indiana State Road 335

Cemeteries
The township contains three cemeteries: Buttontown (in an 1876 obituary, it was called Kepley Schoolhouse Cemetery), Greenlawn and Mount Eden.

References
 
 United States Census Bureau cartographic boundary files

External links
 Indiana Township Association
 United Township Association of Indiana

Townships in Floyd County, Indiana
Townships in Indiana